Disability in Macau refers to the related affairs of people with disability in Macau, China.

Law
China, including Macau, signed the Convention on the Rights of Persons with Disabilities. Law of Macau states the prohibition the discrimination against people with disabilities in education, employment, healthcare access or access to other public services.

Budget
The coordination and funding of public assistance programs for disabled people is under the responsibility of Social Welfare Bureau.

Benefits
On 11 October 2017, the government increased the amount of two disability subsidies for permanent residents with 6.67% increase for regular disability subsidy and 7.14% increase for special disability subsidy.

Public facilities

Transportation
Macau International Airport and ferry terminals are disabled accessible with the help from the staffs. The Social Welfare Bureau also offers free rides to medical facilities by the Rehabilitation Bus services. Transports and tourism services for disabled people are also available by the Macau Barrier Free Tourism. Pedestrians are generally equipped with audible signals and raised-treading. Special lot for disabled people is required at public parking lots.

See also
 Healthcare in Macau

References

Disability in Macau